A street network is a system of interconnecting lines and points (called edges and nodes in network science) that represent a system of streets or roads for a given area. A street network provides the foundation for network analysis; for example, finding the best route or creating service areas.

They greatly affect in-town movement and traffic. Street networks can become very complex in cities. Street networks are very often localized, because there is little non-highway transportation from town to town. The U.S. Highway System is like a street network, but it is national, and consists of highways instead of streets and roads.

See also
 Braess's paradox
 Transport network
 International E-road network
 Inca road system
 Traffic analysis
 Traffic flow
 Permeability
 Grid plan
 List of cities that are inaccessible by road

References

Network
Road infrastructure